Ramaiah University of Applied Sciences (RUAS) is a UGC approved Private University in India.It was created by an act in the State of Karnataka, India and was established in December 2013.

The university is sponsored by Gokula Education Foundation (Medical) trust. The university was created by integrating M.S. Ramaiah College of Hotel Management (1993), M.S. Ramaiah College of Pharmacy (1992), M.S. Ramaiah Dental College (1991) and the M.S. Ramaiah Advanced Learning Centre (2012). The campuses of the university is located at Mathikere and Peenya, Bengaluru, India.

Organization and administration

Governance
The university is governed by the Dr. Honolulu Vice-Chancellor of the university is 	Prof. Kuldeep Kumar Raina.
The university houses various faculties leading to award of degrees in undergraduate(BTech, B.Des., B.H.M., B.Pharm., Pharm. D.,BBA, B.Com., BSc (Hons), B.A., BSc LLB and B.D.S.), post graduate(MTech, M.Des., M.B.A., M.H.A., M.Pharm., M.Phil., M.S. (By Research), M.D.S., M.Com., MSc, M.A., M.P.H. and Post Graduate Research Diploma) and doctoral programs.

Faculties
The different faculties under the university are:
 Faculty of Engineering and Technology
 Faculty of Management and Commerce
 Faculty of Hospitality Management and Catering Technology
 Faculty of Dental Sciences
 Faculty of Pharmacy
 Faculty of Life and Allied Health Sciences
 Faculty of Art and Design
 Faculty of Mathematical & Physical Sciences
 School of Social Sciences
 School of Law

Academics

Admissions 

Admission is specific to the academic program. Examples of accepted admission tests are CET, Uni-GAUGE, COMED-K, and RUAS-AT

Academic programmes  
The university offers academic programmes through its faculties. The Academic programmes of the university are

 Undergraduate programme leading to BTech, B.Des., B.H.M., B.Pharm., Pharm. D.,BBA, B.Com., BSc (Hons), B.A., BSc LLB and B.D.S degree.
 Postgraduate Programme leading to MTech, M.Des., M.B.A., M.H.A., M.Pharm., M.Phil., M.S. (By Research), M.D.S., M.Com., MSc, M.A., M.P.H. and Post Graduate Research Diploma.
The postgraduate programmes are offered through full-time and part-time routes.

Rankings
In 2016, the university was ranked 90th among universities in India issued by the National Institutional Ranking Framework of the Ministry of Human Resource Development, Government of India. The university has been rated as a "Four Star" University under New University Category of Karnataka State University Rating Framework (KSURF). Under the KSURF ranking, RUAS remains as the only University to achieve "Five Stars" for innovation.

Research

Doctoral Research 
The Doctoral Research Programme leads to PhD degree of the university. The doctoral programme is offered under following faculties
 Doctoral Programme in the faculty of Engineering and Technology (PhD)
 Doctoral Programme in the faculty of Art and Design (PhD)
 Doctoral Programme in faculty of Management and Commerce (PhD)
 Doctoral Programme in faculty of Pharmacy (PhD)
 Doctoral Programme in faculty of Dental Sciences (PhD)
 Doctoral Programme in Mathematics, Physics & Chemistry (PhD)
 Doctoral Programme in Hospitality Management and Catering Technology (PhD)

Sponsored Research 
The university with National and International organisations in government, public and private sector would like to undertake research and generate knowledge for the benefit of the Society. The research themes are:
 Energy & Environment
 Energy Conversion Systems
 Signals & Systems
 Embedded Systems
 Control Systems
 Materials and Manufacturing
 Bio Mechanics & Bio Medical Systems
 Structural Mechanics
 Microelectronics, MEMS and Nano Technology
 Pharmaceutical Chemistry, Drug Development and Drug Delivery
 Dentistry
 Industrial and Business Management

Training and Lifelong Learning 
The Directorate will offer the following programmes as part of Training and Lifelong Learning activities:
 Vocational degree programmes leading to B. Voc., degree with various specialisations
 Postgraduate Diploma in Professional Practice (PGDPP) with various specialisations
 Advanced Certificate Programmes (ACP) with various specialisations to train fresh graduates to make them industry ready
 Module Training Programme (MTP) to train practicing professionals to upgrade their technical & managerial knowledge and skills
 Corporate Training Programme (CTP) to upgrade technical knowledge and skills of working professionals
 Seminars, Workshops and Proficiency courses
 Coordinating with industries for offering User Oriented Postgraduate Courses

Techno Centre 
The Techno Centre undertakes following activities
 Provide solutions to Engineering and Health Sciences related requirements from Industry
 Design and Develop Products of relevance in Engineering and Health Sciences
 Provide Testing and Validation services to Industry
 Undertake Commercialization of Technology Products
 Incubate Technology Business
 Support Technology Business

Transferable Skills and Leadership Development Centre 
The Ramaiah University of Applied Sciences considers that it is essential and important to train students on transferable skills, managerial skill and leadership skills in addition to providing Education and Practical Skills with global standards in their chosen area of domain to make them successful in their chosen career. The Centre for Transferable Skills and Leadership Development trains students on
 Transferable Skills
 Managerial Skills
 Leadership Skills
In addition to that the centre conducts training to prepare students for Competitive Exams
 Modules for Undergraduate Programs
 Modules for Postgraduate and Research Scholars
 Training for Competitive exams
 Modules for Leadership Development

See also 
 M. S. Ramaiah
 List of educational institutions in Bangalore

References

External links 
 

Private universities in India
Engineering colleges in Bangalore
Business schools in Bangalore
Educational institutions established in 2013
2013 establishments in India